Giuliano Montaldo (born 22 February 1930) is an Italian film director.

Biography 
While he was still a young student, Montaldo was recruited by the director Carlo Lizzani for the role of leading actor in the film Achtung! Banditi! (1951). Following this experience he began an apprenticeship as an assistant director of Lizzani and Gillo Pontecorvo, as well as appearing in the 1955 Gli Sbandati.

In 1960 he made his debut as a director with Tiro al piccione, a film about the partisan resistance, which entered for a competition in Venice Film Festival in 1961. In 1965 he wrote and directed Una bella grinta, a cynical representation of the economic boom of Italy, winning the Special Prize of the Jury at 15th Berlin International Film Festival. He then directed the production Grand Slam (1967) which starred an international cast including Edward G. Robinson, Klaus Kinski, and Janet Leigh. His cinema career continued with Gott mit uns (1969), Sacco and Vanzetti (1971), Giordano Bruno (1973), a trilogy about the abuses of the military, judicial and religious power; Tempo di uccidere (1989–1991), with actor Nicolas Cage. In 1982 he directed the television miniseries Marco Polo, which won the Emmy Award for Outstanding Miniseries.

In 1971 he was a member of the jury at the 7th Moscow International Film Festival.

Selected filmography
 
 The Blind Woman of Sorrento (1952)
 At the Edge of the City (1953)  
 Tiro al piccione (1961)
 Nudi per vivere (1964) - documentary
 Extraconiugale, episode "La moglie svedese" (1964)
 Una bella grinta (1965)
 Ad ogni costo (1967)
 Dio è con noi (1969)
 Gli intoccabili (1969)
 Sacco and Vanzetti (1971)
 Giordano Bruno (1973)
 L'Agnese va a morire (1976)
 Circuito chiuso (1978) - TV film
 Il giocattolo (1979)
 Arlecchino (1982) - short subject
 Marco Polo (1982) - miniserie TV
 L'addio a Enrico Berlinguer (1984) - short subject
 Il giorno prima (1987)
 Gli occhiali d'oro (1987)
 Tempo di uccidere (1989)
 Ci sarà una volta (1992) - documentary
 Le stagioni dell'aquila (1997) - documentary
 I Demoni di San Pietroburgo (2008)
 L'industriale (2011)

References

External links

Il Dizionario online del cinema 

1930 births
Italian film directors
Living people
Film people from Genoa
David di Donatello Career Award winners